The Wilson Central Business–Tobacco Warehouse District is a national historic district located at Wilson, Wilson County, North Carolina.  It encompasses 152 contributing buildings, 20 contributing sites, and 2 contributing structures in the central business district of Wilson.  The district includes notable examples of Late Victorian and Art Deco style architecture. Located in the district are the separately listed Branch Banking Building, Cherry Hotel, and Wilson County Courthouse.  Other notable buildings include the Woodard-Watson Warehouse, Planter's Warehouse, Passenger Station and Freight Depot (1924), Jackson Chapel First Baptist Church (1913), St. John's African Methodist Episcopal Church (1915), Imperial Tobacco Company (c. 1903, c. 1910, 1919), Winstead-Hardy Building (c. 1866), Rountree Building (1870s), Planter's Bank Building (1920), United States Post Office and Courthouse (1927), Charles L. Coon High School (1922), First National Bank of Wilson Building (1927), Wilson Theatre (1922), Odd Fellows Lodge (1896), and the Works Projects Administration financed Wilson Municipal Building (1938).

It was listed on the National Register of Historic Places in 1984.

References

External links

Historic districts on the National Register of Historic Places in North Carolina
Victorian architecture in North Carolina
Art Deco architecture in North Carolina
Geography of Wilson County, North Carolina
National Register of Historic Places in Wilson County, North Carolina
Tobacco buildings in the United States